Shambaugh is a city in Page County, Iowa, United States. The population was 159 at the time of the 2020 census.

History
Shambaugh was laid out in 1881 as a depot on the Chicago, Burlington and Quincy Railroad. It was named for its founder, James Shambaugh.

Geography
Shambaugh is located at  (40.657058, -95.034595) along the West Nodaway River.

Demographics

2010 census
As of the census of 2010, there were 191 people, 80 households, and 50 families living in the city. The racial makeup of the city was 100.0% White. Hispanic or Latino of any race were 1.6% of the population.

There were 80 households, of which 28.8% had children under the age of 18 living with them, 48.8% were married couples living together, 8.8% had a female householder with no husband present, 5.0% had a male householder with no wife present, and 37.5% were non-families. 35.0% of all households were made up of individuals, and 17.6% had someone living alone who was 65 years of age or older. The average household size was 2.39 and the average family size was 3.12.

The median age in the city was 44.5 years. 26.2% of residents were under the age of 18; 6.3% were between the ages of 18 and 24; 18.3% were from 25 to 44; 27.7% were from 45 to 64; and 21.5% were 65 years of age or older. The gender makeup of the city was 50.3% male and 49.7% female.

2000 census
As of the census of 2000, there were 188 people, 80 households, and 51 families living in the city. The racial makeup of the city was 99.47% White and 0.53% African American. Hispanic or Latino of any race were 2.13% of the population.

There were 80 households, out of which 26.3% had children under the age of 18 living with them, 56.3% were married couples living together, 5.0% had a female householder with no husband present, and 36.3% were non-families. 33.8% of all households were made up of individuals, and 18.8% had someone living alone who was 65 years of age or older. The average household size was 2.35 and the average family size was 3.06.

27.7% are under the age of 18, 3.7% from 18 to 24, 27.1% from 25 to 44, 23.9% from 45 to 64, and 17.6% who were 65 years of age or older. The median age was 39 years. For every 100 females, there were 95.8 males. For every 100 females age 18 and over, there were 94.3 males.

The median income for a household in the city was $40,375, and the median income for a family was $45,179. Males had a median income of $29,844 versus $18,125 for females. The per capita income for the city was $15,089. About 3.8% of families and 4.3% of the population were below the poverty line, including none of those under the age of eighteen and 8.1% of those 65 or over.

Churches
There are three churches in Shambaugh: Shambaugh United Methodist Church; First Church of God; and Harvest Fellowship.

Education
It is in the South Page Community School District.

References

Cities in Page County, Iowa
Cities in Iowa